Olia Tira (born Olga Tsyra on 1 August 1988), also known by her stage name FLUX LIGHT, is a German-born Moldovan singer.

Early life
Tira was born in 1988 into a Soviet military family in Potsdam, East Germany. She spent a few years there and moved to Chișinău. She first appeared in festivals and concerts when she was 14 years old.

Tira attended school in Cahul and is currently a student in the Academy of Music, Theatre and Fine Arts in Chișinău.

Tira's first album, Your Place or Mine?, was released in December 2006 by Nordika Multimedia. The songs were all written by Ruslan Taranu.

Eurovision Song Contest
After participating in the 2006 and 2007 Moldovan national finals and finishing fourth in the 2009 Moldovan national final with Unicul Meu, she was selected to represent Moldova in the Eurovision Song Contest 2010, along with SunStroke Project. They finished 22nd in the Eurovision Song Contest final. She was a finalist in O melodie pentru europa 2014, Moldova's national selection for the Eurovision Song Contest 2014 with the song "Never Stop No". She competed under the stage name, FLUX LIGHT. She tied for sixth place and did not qualify to represent Moldova.

References

External links

1988 births
Eurovision Song Contest entrants of 2010
Living people
Eurovision Song Contest entrants for Moldova
Musicians from Potsdam
Musicians from Chișinău
21st-century Moldovan women singers
Moldovan expatriates in Germany
Soviet expatriates in Germany
German people of Moldovan descent